Microdrillia dinos is a species of sea snail, a marine gastropod mollusk in the family Borsoniidae.

Description
The small, claviform shell has a maximum length of 7 mm and a width of 2.8 mm. The protoconch contains at least 4 whorls and the teleoconch 5 whorls. The protoconch has 35 axial riblets on its penultimate whorl and 21 to 24 ribs on its last whorl. The collabral threads are weak. On the base of the body whorl one can see 12 to 13 spiral lirae.

Distribution
This marine species occurs on the continental slope of Eastern Transkei, South Africa

References

External links
 
  Bouchet P., Kantor Yu.I., Sysoev A. & Puillandre N. (2011) A new operational classification of the Conoidea. Journal of Molluscan Studies 77: 273–308

Endemic fauna of South Africa
dinos
Gastropods described in 1986